The National Council for the Maltese Language was founded in April 2005 with the enactment of the Maltese Language Act (Att dwar l-Ilsien Malti) (Chap. 470) in the Maltese Parliament. Its work is to regulate new words coming into Maltese and promote the standard Maltese language in education and other new sectors. The council consists of five committees which are: Media, Education, Language Research, Translations and Terminology and the Development of Maltese in the Information and Technology Sector.  The council's aim is the language planning and promotion of the Maltese language, and thus to improve it by modernising its structures.

The National Council for the Maltese Language is a member of the EFNIL (European Federation of National Institutions for Language) in the EU.

See also 

 Roderick Bovingdon

External links
 Official Website

Language regulators
Maltese language
Cultural organisations based in Malta
2005 establishments in Malta